Nadeem Baig may refer to:

 Nadeem Baig (actor) (born 1941), Pakistani actor, singer and producer
 Nadeem Baig (director) (born 1975), Pakistani film and television director, producer and writer